Cirrus Insight is a customer relationship management (CRM) platform that integrates Salesforce with third-party services, including Gmail and Microsoft's Office 365. The application was the first on Salesforce's AppExchange application marketplace to integrate Gmail with Salesforce.com, and it was the top-ranked application on the site for five months in 2012.

Functionality
Cirrus Insight's core functionality is to integrate Google's Gmail email service with Salesforce's customer relationship management program. Features include the ability to track Gmail emails and attachments in Salesforce, view Salesforce information in Gmail and other Google Apps, synchronize the Salesforce and Google calendars, and add the user's Google Contacts to Salesforce.

History
Cirruspath was founded by Ryan Huff and Brandon Bruce, two friends who met while at University of California, Santa Barbara. Their first product was Cirrus Insight, launched in 2011, and it was inspired by the existing tools for Microsoft Outlook integration with Salesforce.

In 2013, the company released an iOS mobile application, Cirrus Insight Mobile, to support mobile users. Also in 2013, Cirrus Insight partnered with UberConference to integrate conference calls through email chains. The integration eliminated the need for Salesforce and Cirrus Insight customers to dial in and use PINs for conference calls.

In May 2014, Cirruspath announced Cirrus Files, a program designed to allow the integration of Google Drive with Salesforce.

In June 2014, Cirruspath announced two new products for Cirrus Insight: Gmail email tracking, allowing users to get real-time alerts as their emails were opened, and Cirrus Insight Analytics, a free package that generates management reports showing usage and adoption of Cirrus Insight and Salesforce.com.

In October 2016, Cirruspath released Cirrus Insight 5.0, which completely updated the design of the app and added improvements to recently added features such as Book Meeting and Email Campaigns.

Ranking
In 2016, Inc. magazine ranked Cirrus Insight 41st on the annual Inc. 5000 list, a ranking of the nation's fastest-growing private companies. In 2017, it was ranked 546th.

References

External links
 

Customer relationship management software